Xavier Malisse, who was the defending champion, lost to Ilija Bozoljac already in the second round.
Nicolas Mahut won in the final 2–6, 7–6(6), 7–6(4), against Grigor Dimitrov.

Seeds

Draw

Finals

Top half

Bottom half

References

 Main Draw
 Qualifying Draw

Singles